Dirona pellucida is a species of sea slug, a northern Pacific Ocean nudibranch, a marine, opisthobranch gastropod mollusk in the family Dironidae.

This species feeds on the bryozoan species Bugula pacifica.

Distribution
This nudibranch occurs from Oregon to Alaska, and across the Bering Sea south to Japan and Korea.

Description
This species, like others in the genus, is translucent with large, broad cerata. The color is various shades of orange, with a white line on the edge of all of the cerata.

References

 SeaslugForum info at: 
 Slugsite info at:

Further reading
 Behrens David W., 1980, Pacific Coast Nudibranchs: a guide to the opisthobranchs of the northeastern Pacific, Sea Challenger Books, California

Dironidae
Gastropods described in 1941